The cheek-lined wrasse, Oxycheilinus digramma, is a species of wrasse native to the Indian Ocean and the western Pacific Ocean. It is of minor importance to local commercial fisheries and can also be found in the aquarium trade. The side of the fish's head has horizontal stripes, while the front of the head has red spots. Coloring of the fish varies from pale gray to purple. Aquarium specimens are less tense than their wild counterparts.

Juveniles of O. digramma have been observed to live among the tentacles of the mushroom coral Heliofungia actiniformis. 
This species eats sea urchins, molluscs, and crustaceans. It uses other fish as a moving blind to approach its prey.

References

External links
 

Cheek-lined wrasse
Fish described in 1801